The Wife is a 1995 film written and directed by Tom Noonan, based on his play Wifey.  The film was nominated for the Grand Jury Prize at the 1995 Sundance Film Festival, after Noonan had won the Grand Prize the previous year with What Happened Was.

Plot
Jack and his wife Rita, both professional therapists, live and work in virtual isolation in a remote Vermont cottage. One night, one of Jack's patients, Cosmo, unexpectedly turns up with young wife Arlie in tow. And the more the couples talk and drink, the more tension builds over what personal issues are being shared in analysis, as well as the private troubles of the therapists themselves.

Cast
 Tom Noonan as Jack
 Wallace Shawn as Cosmo
 Karen Young as Arlie
 Julie Hagerty as Rita
 Danny Darrow as The Tailor (uncredited)

Critical reception
Stephen Holden of The New York Times gave the film a mixed review:

References

External links 
 
 

1995 films
1995 comedy-drama films
American independent films
Films about psychiatry
American films based on plays
1990s English-language films
American comedy-drama films
1995 independent films
1990s American films